Gray Gables is a neighborhood and platted subdivision within the city limits of Tampa, Florida. As of the 2000 census Gray Gables and the adjoining neighborhood of Bon Air had a combined population of 921. The ZIP Code serving the neighborhood is 33609.

Geography
Gray Gables is located to the east of Dale Mabry Highway. The platted boundaries of the subdivision are S. Beverly Avenue on the East, Azeele Street to the South, Himes Avenue to the West and Kennedy Boulevard to the North. The neighborhood is located within the South Tampa region.

See also
Neighborhoods in Tampa, Florida

References

External links

Neighborhoods in Tampa, Florida